Hackney Hawks speedway opened in 1963 at Hackney Wick Stadium, Waterden Road, London and operated until 1983. The team replaced the Hackney Wick Wolves who had raced at the stadium from 1935 to 1939. The Hawks were then themselves replaced by the Hackney Kestrels.

Early days
Originally opened by Mike Parker, the team joined the Provincial League in 1963. The team finished 10th in their debut season in the 1963 Provincial Speedway League. The promotion was then sold to Len Silver who was the club's promoter for the next twenty seasons. The riders and track staff marched onto the track to the sound of the theme tune of the film The Magnificent Seven and that tune inspires more memories for Hackney Hawks fans than anything else.  The Hawks were closely linked with sister track the Rayleigh Rockets and latterly the Rye House Rockets.

In 1971, Hackney won their only major honour when they beat Cradley Heath Heathens to win the British League Knockout Cup. They had previously finished runner-up in the league during the 1968 British League season. The team finished runner-up again durin the 1980 British League season but ceased to operate after the 1983 season.

The Hackney Hawks name was revived in 2011 in the National League as a joint promotion between the promotions at Lakeside and Rye House with the Hawks home matches being divided between the two parent tracks.

Vic Harding
In June 1979, popular Hawk Vic Harding was killed whilst racing for the team. A Vic Harding Memorial Trophy meeting was held in his memory every season after his death, and was in fact the final meeting that Len Silver ran at Waterden Road in 1983.

Closure
In 1984 the promotion was sold and the promotion from Crayford moved their Kestrels team into the stadium and became known as the Hackney Kestrels.

Season summary

Notable Hackney Riders

 (ex promoter of Coventry Bees)

 (ex promoter of Rye House Rockets)

See also
Hackney Wick Wolves
Hackney Kestrels
London Lions

References 

Defunct British speedway teams
Sport in the London Borough of Hackney
Sports clubs established in 1963
Sports clubs disestablished in 1983
Speedway teams in London
Speedway National League teams
Hackney Wick
Hackney, London